The Frauen-Bundesliga 1994–95 was the 5th season of the Frauen-Bundesliga, Germany's premier football league. It was the last season, in which 2 points were awarded for a win. Beginning with the following season the standard 3 points were awarded for wins. In the final the champion of the southern division, FSV Frankfurt, won 2–0 against the champion of the northern division, Grün-Weiß Brauweiler. Frankfurt thus won their second championship. By winning the cup final six weeks later they completed the Double.

Northern conference

Standings

Results

Southern conference

Standings

Results

Semifinals

Final

Top scorers

Qualification

Group North

Group South 1

Group South 2

References

1994-95
Ger
1
Women